The following list is of important municipalities in Aragon, an autonomous community of Spain:

Provincial lists 
The following links are to lists which are more detailed province-specific, and all municipalities in a given province are ranked by population.

 List of municipalities in Huesca
 List of municipalities in Taruel
 List of municipalities in Zaragoza

By population

See also 

 Comarcas of Aragon

References